

Gottfried von Erdmannsdorff (25 April 1893 – 30 January 1946) was a German general during World War II. He was convicted by a Soviet military tribunal for war crimes at the Minsk Trial and executed in 1946.

Fortress Mogilev
On 27 June 1944 Soviet troops managed to push forward and make a deep breakthrough north of Mogilev by crossing the Dnieper River over a bridge at Trebuchi. The 4th Army dispatched a message to General Erdmannsdorff that Mogilev be held as a "fortified position" and ordered him to hold the town until the very last man. The 4th Army retreated the XXXIX Panzer Corps and the XII Army Corps a full 21km west of Mogilev, leaving the town to its fate against the overwhelming Soviet attacks. Later in the evening General Erdmannsdorff reported that German forces had been weakened and the Soviets had started to reach the edge of the city. Only 2 hours and 40 minutes later General Erdmannsdorff stated that the only part of the city still under his control was the city center and hand to hand combat was starting to take place. The last radio message that was received from Mogilev was at 11 o'clock in the evening and it was Lieutenant General Rudolf Bamler the commanding officer of the 12th Infantry Division requesting that Captain Opke of Artillery Regiment 12 should receive the Oak leaves of the Knight's Cross for "outstanding military exploits".

Minsk Trial

After the Soviet troops defeated "Fortress Mogilev", Erdmannsdorff was captured by Soviet troops. He was tried by a Soviet tribunal (the Minsk Trial) for crimes committed in Belarus along with 18 other defendants, 14 of whom, including Erdmannsdorff, were sentenced to death on 29 January 1946.

Erdmannsdorff was condemned on charges including the deportation of 10,000 people, the destruction of villages, schools and churches, and the shootings of disabled people during the construction of fortifications, the use of people as human shields, and the organization of reprisals operations against civilians under the guise of fighting partisans, and the establishment of camps in which many people died.

The officers were hanged in public (with over 100,000 civilian spectators) in the horse racing venue of Minsk, on 30 January 1946. He was the younger brother of General der Infanterie Werner von Erdmannsdorff.

Awards and decorations

 Knight's Cross of the Iron Cross on 20 March 1942 as Oberst and commander of Infanterie-Regiment 171

References

Citations

Bibliography

 

1893 births
1946 deaths
Holocaust perpetrators in Belarus
People from Kamenz
People from the Kingdom of Saxony
Major generals of the German Army (Wehrmacht)
German Army personnel of World War I
Reichswehr personnel
Recipients of the clasp to the Iron Cross, 1st class
Recipients of the Gold German Cross
Recipients of the Knight's Cross of the Iron Cross
German prisoners of war in World War II held by the Soviet Union
Executed people from Saxony
Executed military leaders
Military personnel from Saxony
20th-century Freikorps personnel
Nazis executed by the Soviet Union by hanging
People executed for war crimes
Executed mass murderers